The following is a list of players who was played for FK Vardar.

Notable players

References

External links

 Official website 
 Players from A–Z at Worldfootball

 
Players
Vardar
Vardar players
Association football player non-biographical articles